Yellow / AC-2 (Atlantic Crossing 2) is a submarine telecommunications cable system linking the United States and the United Kingdom. The cable is wholly owned by CenturyLink (formerly Level 3 Communications) in the US following its acquisition of Global Crossing. The original owners, which each owned two of the fibre pairs, gave this cable system different names, so it is known as both Yellow (after the Beatles song Yellow Submarine) and AC-2. It has a capacity of 320 Gbit/s as of January 2007, upgradeable to 640 Gbit/s.

It has landing points in:
Bellport/Brookhaven, New York, United States
Bude, Cornwall, United Kingdom

References

  
 

Submarine communications cables in the North Atlantic Ocean
Transatlantic communications cables
Infrastructure completed in 2000
United Kingdom–United States relations
2000 establishments in England
2000 establishments in New York (state)